Jan Šeda (born 17 December 1985) is a Czech professional footballer who plays as a goalkeeper for Czech First League club Mladá Boleslav.

Playing career

FK Mladá Boleslav
Šeda signed for FK Mladá Boleslav in 2005 and also won the Czech Cup with his side in 2011. He went out on a long-term loan for the 2013–14 season to RKC Waalwijk and for a short-term loan to FC Goa in 2014, where he was awarded with the Golden Glove. He returned to FK Mladá Boleslav in 2018.

RKC Waalwijk (loan)
Šeda made 23 appearances for RKC Waalwijk.

FC Goa (loan)
Šeda joined FC Goa on loan for the 2014 Indian Super League, he made 14 appearances for the club and was also awarded the Golden Glove for his excellent goalkeeping throughout the tournament, he also kept seven clean sheets in the tournament which was the highest.

Honours
Mladá Boleslav
Czech Cup: 2010–11, 2015–16; runner-up: 2012–13 

Individual
Indian Super League Golden Glove: 2014

References

External links

Voetbal International profile 

1985 births
Living people
Czech footballers
Czech expatriate footballers
Czech First League players
Eredivisie players
FK Mladá Boleslav players
RKC Waalwijk players
Expatriate footballers in the Netherlands
Association football goalkeepers
FC Goa players
Indian Super League players
Expatriate footballers in India
Czech expatriate sportspeople in the Netherlands
Czech expatriate sportspeople in India
People from Vysoké Mýto
Sportspeople from the Pardubice Region